Archangel is a virtual reality first-person shooter game for Windows, PlayStation 4, and Oculus Quest, developed by Skydance Interactive. A free update titled Archangel: Hellfire was released in 2018.

Gameplay

The player plays as an experienced combat ace and Archangel test pilot Gabriel or Gabby Walker as humanity's last best hope of The Free. Players get to control a giant mech known as the Archangel with shields, power ups, and weapons to take down the HUMNX. Using both twin controllers or a gamepad control, players can fire an array of weapons on each mighty mech arm, or smash enemy units with your fists. They would also have to upgrade them by choice, meaning they have to choose one of the weapons upgraded to the mech carefully.

Plot
At the end of the 21st century, the world is in ruins as a consequence of disastrous ecological disaster. In control of the world is HUMNX, a corporation born out of a desire to heal the world, no matter the human cost. Opportunistic and driven by cold logic, it is trying to rebuild the world under its vision. Opposing it are the remnants of the United States Armed Forces, now the self-proclaimed United States Free Forces (USFF), or ‘The Free’. To resolve this, The Free created an experimental weapon called The Archangel, to take freedom back for humanity from HUMNX.

Development
In May 2016, Skydance launched the Skydance Interactive division last year following the acquisition of The Workshop Entertainment and announced in January 2017 for a new VR story-driven game titled Archangel which later showcased at E3 2017.

Reception

The game has received mixed reviews from critics according to review aggregator Metacritic. Gaming Nexus gave it a positive review of a 8.55 out of 10, COGConnected gave it a 91 out of 100, and UploadVR gave it an 8 out of 10.

References

External links
 

2017 video games
First-person shooters
PlayStation 4 games
PlayStation VR games
Oculus Rift games
Single-player video games
Skydance Media games
Skydance Interactive games
Unreal Engine games
Video games developed in the United States
Video games featuring protagonists of selectable gender
Virtual reality games
Windows games